Dudhkanra  is a village in Chanditala I community development block of Srirampore subdivision in Hooghly district in the Indian state of West Bengal.

Geography

Gram panchayat
Villages in Ainya gram panchayat are: Akuni, Aniya, Bandpur, Banipur, Bara Choughara, Dudhkanra, Ganeshpur, Goplapur, Jiara, Kalyanbati, Mukundapur, Sadpur and Shyamsundarpur.

Demographics
As per 2011 Census of India Dudhkanra had a total population of 391 of which 206 (53%) were males and 185 (47%) were females. Population below 6 years was 46. The total number of literates in Aniya was 284 (82.32% of the population over 6 years).

Economy
Known solely for their exquisite strawberry fruit, this village thrives in the region.

Transport
Bargachia railway station is the nearest railway station.

References 

Villages in Chanditala I CD Block